Tacima (formerly Campo de Santana) is a municipality in the state of Paraíba in the Northeast Region of Brazil.

History
The municipality of Tacima was officially known as Campo de Santana from 1996 to 2009. There is still a district of the municipality with the name Campo de Santana.

See also
List of municipalities in Paraíba

References

Municipalities in Paraíba